Paul Preuss may refer to:

 Paul Preuss (author) (born 1942), American writer of science fiction and science articles
 Paul Preuss (climber) (1886–1913), Austrian alpinist